Pot liquor, sometimes spelled potlikker or pot likker, is the liquid that is left behind after boiling greens (collard greens, mustard greens, turnip greens) or beans. It is sometimes seasoned with salt and pepper, smoked pork or smoked turkey. Pot liquor contains high amounts of essential vitamins and minerals including iron, vitamin A and vitamin C. Especially important is that it contains high amounts of vitamin K, which aids in blood clotting. Another term is collard liquor.

Background
Former governor and U.S. senator Zell Miller of Georgia wrote a defense of the traditional spelling "potlikker" in The New York Times.

Much earlier, in his autobiography, Every Man a King, governor and U.S. senator Huey Pierce Long, Jr., of Louisiana, defined "potlikker", a favorite of his country political supporters, as
the juice that remains in a pot after greens or other vegetables are boiled with proper seasoning. The best seasoning is a piece of salt fat pork, commonly referred to as "dry salt meat" or "side meat". If a pot be partly filled with well-cleaned turnip greens and turnips (which should be cut up), with a half-pound piece of the salt pork and then with water and boiled until the greens and turnips are cooked reasonably tender, then the juice remaining in the pot is the delicious, invigorating, soul-and-body sustaining potlikker ... which should be taken as any other soup and the greens eaten as any other food. ... 

[Long continued] Most people crumble cornpone (corn meal mixed with a little salt and water, made into a pattie and baked until it is hard) into the potlikker.The practice of consuming potlikker was commonly employed by slaves in the United States to concentrate nutrients from vegetables.

See also
 Reduction
 Stock

References

Cuisine of the Southern United States
Soups
Vegetable dishes
Brassica oleracea dishes
Brassica dishes
Huey Long
Soul food